One Way is a brand of sports equipment and apparel for cross-country skiing, alpine skiing and other outdoor sports. 
The One Way Sport company was established in 2004 by Andreas Bennert in Vantaa, Finland to produce ski poles. It went bankrupt in 2018 and the trademark and patent rights were bought by Fischer Sports.

References

Sportswear brands
Ski equipment manufacturers